The 1967 Miami Redskins football team was an American football team that represented Miami University in the Mid-American Conference (MAC) during the 1967 NCAA University Division football season. In their fifth season under Bo Schembechler, Miami compiled a 6–4 record (4–2 against MAC opponents), finished in a tie for third place in the MAC, and outscored all opponents by a combined total of 181 to 113.  Gary Moeller, Larry Smith, and Chuck Stobart all joined Schembechler's staff as assistant coaches in 1967. The team's 14–3 victory over Tulane on September 23, 1967, is regarded as one of the Miami football program's greatest victories.

The team's statistical leaders included quarterback Kent Thompson with 460 passing yards, halfback Al Moore with 717 rushing yards, and end Gary Arthur with 145 receiving yards. The team's defense allowed only 11.4 points per game, 14th best among 118 NCAA University Division football teams.

Linebacker Bob Babich won the team's most valuable player award. Six Miami players were selected as first-team All-MAC players: Babich, tight end Gary Arthur, center Paul Krasula, halfback Al Moore, safety Bob Smith, and guard Dave Tsaloff. Tsaloff, Bob Smith, Jim Shaw, qne Bob Thomas were the team captains.

Schedule

References

Miami
Miami RedHawks football seasons
Miami Redskins football